L'insegnante va in collegio (internationally released as The Schoolteacher Goes to Boys' High and The School Teacher in College) is a 1977 commedia sexy all'italiana directed by Mariano Laurenti. The film is the second in the "Schoolteacher" film series.

Plot 
A commander of northern Italy is embroiled in a shady deal, and is forced to flee to Apulia. There, the man falls in love with his son's beautiful teacher: Monica Sebastiani. The son, however, loves also Monica Sebastiani, and so comes into the fight with his father.

Cast 
 Edwige Fenech: Monica Sebastiani
 Renzo Montagnani: Riccardo Pozzoni
 Leo Colonna: Carlo Bolzoni
 Alvaro Vitali: Armandino
 Lino Banfi: Peppino
 Gianfranco D'Angelo: Prof. Strumolo 
 Carlo Sposito: Prof. Morlupo
 Lucio Montanaro: Student

References

External links
 

1977 films
Commedia sexy all'italiana
Italian high school films
Insegnante films
Films directed by Mariano Laurenti
1970s sex comedy films
Films scored by Gianni Ferrio
1977 comedy films
1970s Italian films